Pristimantis yaviensis is a species of frog in the family Strabomantidae. It is endemic to Venezuela and known from its type locality, the summit of Cerro Yaví ( above sea level), a sandstone table-top mountain (tepui), and from Cerro Yutajé ( above sea level), both in the Amazonas State. The specific name yaviensis refers to the type locality.

Description
Males measure  and females  in snout–vent length. The coloration is variable; the dorsal ground color is light or dark brown, grayish brown, or orangish brown. Dorsal color patterns include dark chevrons, longitudinal dark lines, and sharply bicolor middorsum from the sides. The ventral surfaces are grayish, sometimes pale grayish yellow. The dorsal skin is finely granular to nearly smooth with scattered warts; ventral skin is areolate. The tympanum is absent. The snout is rounded, sometimes truncate in lateral profile. The upper eyelids have small flat tubercles. The fingers lack webbing but the toes have basal webbing; both fingers and toes have broad discs.

Habitat and conservation
It has mostly been collected on vegetation in montane tepui forest or under rock slabs, although one specimen was observed in open, scrubby thicket about 1.5 m above ground. It the most common Pristimantis species on Cerro Yaví. No threats to this species are known.

References

yaviensis
Amphibians of Venezuela
Endemic fauna of Venezuela
Taxa named by Charles W. Myers
Taxa named by Maureen Ann Donnelly
Amphibians described in 1996
Taxonomy articles created by Polbot
Amphibians of the Tepuis